In Marxist theory, false consciousness is a term describing the ways in which material, ideological, and institutional processes are said to mislead members of the proletariat and other class actors within capitalist societies, concealing the exploitation intrinsic to the social relations between classes. Friedrich Engels (1820–1895) used the term "false consciousness" in an 1893 letter to Franz Mehring to address the scenario where a subordinate class willfully embodies the ideology of the ruling class. Engels dubs this consciousness "false" because the class is asserting itself towards goals that do not benefit it.

"Consciousness", in this context, reflects a class's ability to politically identify and assert its will. The subordinate class is conscious if it plays a major role in society and can assert its will due to being sufficiently unified in ideas and action.

Later development 
Marshall I. Pomer has argued that members of the proletariat disregard the true nature of class relations because of their belief in the probability or possibility of upward mobility. Such a belief or something like it is said to be required in economics with its presumption of rational agency; otherwise wage laborers would not be the conscious supporters of social relations antithetical to their own interests, violating that presumption.

Cultural hegemony 
The Italian Marxist theorist Antonio Gramsci developed the concept of cultural hegemony, the process within capitalist societies by which the ruling classes create particular  norms, values, and stigmas, amounting to a culture in which their continued dominance is considered beneficial.

Structuralism 
During the late 1960s and 1970s, the philosophical and anthropological school of structuralism began to gain popularity among academics and public intellectuals, focusing on interpreting human culture in terms of underlying structures such as symbolic, linguistic, and ideological perspectives. Marxist philosopher Louis Althusser popularized his structuralist interpretation of false consciousness, the Ideological State Apparatus. Structuralism influenced Althusser's interpretation of false consciousness, which focuses on the institutions of the capitalist state⁠—particularly those of public education⁠—which enforce an ideological system favoring obedience, conformity and submissiveness.

See also 

 Capitalist realism
 Character mask
 Class consciousness
 Cognitive dissonance
 Consciousness raising
 Cultural hegemony
 Culture industry
 Dominant ideology
 "Ideology and Ideological State Apparatuses"
 Introspection illusion
 Karl Marx's theory of alienation
 Political consciousness
 Propaganda model
 Spectacle
 System justification
 Turkeys voting for Christmas
 Hermeneutics of suspicion

References

External links 
 Joseph McCarney (2005). Ideology and False Consciousness.

Marxist theory
Error
Consciousness